Elizabeth Bishop is an American mezzo-soprano and voice teacher. She has sung at the Metropolitan Opera more than 60 times, and is generally known for playing prominent supporting roles in major operas.

Early life
Born in South Carolina, Bishop studied at Furman University and obtained a double BA in Political Science and Music. She then decided to pursue a career in opera, and trained at the Juilliard School. She won the 1993 Metropolitan Opera National Council Auditions and accepted a role at the San Francisco Opera as an Adler Fellow in 1994.

Career

Operatic career

She has been most closely associated with the Washington National Opera, the San Francisco Opera, and the Metropolitan Opera.  Her versatile operatic roles have included Emilia (Otello),  Eboli (Don Carlo), Meg Page (Falstaff),  La Marquise de Merteuil (The Dangerous Liaisons), Suzuki (Madama Butterfly), and her frequent role of Mère Marie in Poulenc's Dialogues des Carmélites. She has also often appeared as Wagnerian heroines, including Fricka, Waltraute, and Second Norn (Der Ring des Nibelungen) and Brangäne (Tristan und Isolde). 
In 2013, she gained attention for becoming one of the few artists to perform two major roles in one day at the Metropolitan Opera, namely Mère Marie in Dialogues des Carmélites  and Fricka in Wagner's Das Rheingold. Anthony Tommasini of the New York times described this event, calling her performance "vocally lustrous".

On the concert platform, Bishop often performs Mahler, with Das Lied von der Erde, and Mahler's Second, Third and Eighth Symphonies in her repertoire.

Speaking about her own career to The Washington Post, Bishop stated: "I have made a decent career out of being the world's best fourth choice. They can't get the star, they can't get the old star, they can't get the new girl who is coming up: Let's call Betsy. She can do anything".

Teaching

Bishop is a voice teacher at the Juilliard School, and has also taught at her other alma mater, Furman University. In addition, she has taught at Palm Beach Opera, Wolf Trap Opera Company, Baldwin Wallace Conservatory of Music, and Washington National Opera Institute for Young Singers.

Bishop formed the Potomac Vocal Institute in 2014 with pianist Patrick O'Donnell. The institute's stated vision is "To bridge the gap between academia and the stage and shift the paradigm for how successful operatic careers begin."

Personal life
Bishop's husband, Ken Weiss, works at the Washington National Opera as a voice coach. The couple, who have a daughter, live in the District of Columbia.

References 

American operatic mezzo-sopranos
20th-century American women opera singers
21st-century American women opera singers
Voice teachers
American women music educators
Living people
Year of birth missing (living people)
Furman University alumni
Juilliard School alumni
Singers from South Carolina
Classical musicians from South Carolina
Winners of the Metropolitan Opera National Council Auditions